LRO may mean:

 Lunar Reconnaissance Orbiter, a NASA spacecraft launched in 2009
 Large receive offload, in computer networking, a technique for increasing inbound throughput
 Light Railway Order, an order made under the Light Railways Act 1896 for the construction or operation of a railway in the United Kingdom
 Land Rover Owner, a magazine about Land Rover vehicles
 Left-to-right override, a Unicode character (U+202D) used in bi-directional text
Legal Rights Observatory, a legal rights activism group